PDCD10 can refer to:
 Sevogle Airport
 an alternate name for PDCD10